(born 3 September 1956) is a Japanese former ski jumper.

Career
He competed from 1980 to 1986. He finished fourth in the individual large hill event at the 1980 Winter Olympics in Lake Placid, New York. Akimoto's best finish at the FIS Nordic World Ski Championships was sixth in the team large hill events at Seefeld, Austria in 1985. He earned a total of four World Cup wins from 1980 to 1985.

World Cup

Standings

Wins

External links

Ski jumpers at the 1980 Winter Olympics
Japanese male ski jumpers
Living people
1956 births
Olympic ski jumpers of Japan
Sportspeople from Sapporo
20th-century Japanese people